George Jordan may refer to:

 George Jordan (Medal of Honor) (1847–1904), Buffalo Soldier in the United States Army and Medal of Honor recipient
 George Jordan (footballer, born 1903) (1903–1972), Scottish footballer for Bury, Newport County and Rochdale
 George Jordan (footballer) (1917–1944), Scottish football right back
 George Racey Jordan (1898–1966), American military officer, businessman, lecturer, activist, and author